After its well-known growth-share matrix, the Boston Consulting Group developed another, much less widely reported, matrix which approached the economies of scale decision rather more directly. This is known as their Advantage Matrix.  The matrix was published in a 1981 Perspective titled "Strategy in the 1980s" by Richard Lochridge.

Overview
Similar to the growth-share matrix, the Advantage Matrix groups businesses into four categories.  These are volume, stalemated, specialized and fragmented businesses. However, this matrix takes as its axes the two contrasting alternatives, economies of scale (described by them as 'potential size of advantage') against differentiation (shown as 'number of approaches to achieving advantage'). In essence, the former category covers the approach described in the more popular growth-share matrix, while the latter represents the approach (described by Michael Porter) of differentiating products so that they do not compete head-on with their competitors.

 Volume business. In this case there are considerable economies of scale, but few opportunities for differentiation. This is the classic situation in which organizations strive for economies of scale by becoming the volume, and hence, cost leader. Examples are volume cars and consumer electronics.
 Stalemated business. Here there is neither the opportunity for differentiation nor economies of scale; examples are textiles and shipbuilding. The main means of competition, therefore, has been reducing the `factor costs' (mainly those of labor) by moving to locations where these costs are lower, even to different countries in the developing world.
 Specialized business. These businesses gain benefits from both economies of scale and differentiation (often characterized by experience effects in their own, differentiated, segment); examples being branded foods and cosmetics. The main strategies are focus and segment leadership.
 Fragmented business. These organizations also gain benefit from differentiation, particularly in the services sector, but little from economies of scale; examples being restaurants and job-shop engineering. Competition may be minimized by innovatory differentiation.

Practical Use of the Advantage Matrix
"These two factors – the size of the advantage and the number of ways it can be achieved – can be combined into a simple matrix to help guide more creative strategy development. The specific requirements for success are different in each quadrant."--Richard Lochridge

Size of Advantage
The Boston Consulting Group described the size of advantage as a company's ability to gain economies of scale.

Number of Approaches to Achieving Advantage
The number of approaches to achieving advantage is the company's ability to differentiate from their competitors.

Critical Reception

Apart from the fact that it has not suffered as badly at the hands of later popularizers, the particular advantage of this matrix is that it highlights the assumptions that are hidden in the Growth-Share Matrix. It may also give a better feel for the optimum strategy and the likely profits, but it does not give any feel for the cash flow, which was the main feature of the original matrix.

References and Sources
Notes

Sources
M. E. Porter, 'Competitive Strategy' (Free Press, 1980)

Boston Consulting Group
Management cybernetics